The Population Register Centre is a Finnish government agency, which provides demographic information services for Finnish citizens, public administrations, businesses and communities, as well as polling services for elections. The VRK was established in 1969, and is under direct control of Finnish Ministry of Finance.

References

External links
 

Government of Finland